Early High School is a 3A public high school located in Early, Texas, United States. It is part of the Early Independent School District located in central Brown County. In 2015, the school was rated "Met Standard" by the Texas Education Agency.

Athletics
The Early Longhorns compete in the following sports:

Baseball
Basketball
Cross Country
Football
Golf
Powerlifting
Softball
Tennis
Track and Field
Volleyball

References

External links
Early ISD

Public high schools in Texas
Schools in Brown County, Texas